Russin railway station is a railway station in the municipality of Russin, in the Swiss canton of Geneva. It is an intermediate stop on the standard gauge Lyon–Geneva line of Swiss Federal Railways.

Services 
The following services stop at Russin:

 Léman Express:

References

External links 
 

Railway stations in the canton of Geneva
Swiss Federal Railways stations
Lyon–Geneva railway